Tom Pittman may refer to:

 Tom Pittman (actor), American film and television actor
 Tom Pittman (computer scientist), American computer scientist